Riley Barber (born February 7, 1994) is an American professional ice hockey forward who is currently under contract with the Dallas Stars of the National Hockey League (NHL). Barber was selected by the Washington Capitals in the sixth round (167th overall) of the 2012 NHL Entry Draft. He is the son of former NHL player Don Barber.

Playing career
As a youth, Barber played in the 2006 and 2007 Quebec International Pee-Wee Hockey Tournaments  with the Pittsburgh Hornets, and then the Detroit Red Wings minor ice hockey teams.

Barber played college hockey for the Miami RedHawks of Miami University in Oxford, Ohio. In his freshman year, Barber's outstanding play was rewarded with a selection to the 2012–13 Central Collegiate Hockey Association All-Conference First Team. In 40 games, he tallied 15 goals and 24 assists for 39 points and was second in team scoring by then-sophomore Austin Czarnik. On December 22, 2013, during his sophomore season at Miami, Barber was named captain of the United States men's national junior ice hockey team for the 2014 World Junior Ice Hockey Championships. He had been a member of the 2013 United States squad that won gold.

On April 17, 2015, Barber chose to forego his senior with Miami and signed a three-year entry-level deal with the Capitals. He was assigned to the Capitals' AHL affiliate, the Hershey Bears. He made his professional debut on October 10, 2015, registering two goals in a 5–1 win over the Springfield Falcons.

During the 2016–17 season, on February 24, 2017, Barber made his NHL debut with the Capitals against the Edmonton Oilers.

On December 7, 2018, the Capitals recalled Barber from Hershey after placing T. J. Oshie on injured reserve, though he did not play. He led the Bears with 18 points in 20 appearances for the season before being recalled.

On July 1, 2019, Barber joined the Montreal Canadiens as a free agent, agreeing to a one-year, two-way contract. After participating in the Canadiens training camp, Barber was waived on September 24, 2019. He was reassigned to the Canadiens minor league affiliate, Laval Rocket, to begin the 2019–20 season.

After leading the Rocket in points with 18 (6G, 12A) points in 21 games. The Canadiens decided to recall Barber to the NHL on December 8, 2019. This was his first NHL call-up since playing three NHL games with the Washington Capitals in the 2016–17 season. After playing eight games and registering zero points with the Montreal Canadiens, Barber was sent back to Laval. On February 20, 2020, while with Laval, Barber was traded by the Canadiens along with Phil Varone to the Pittsburgh Penguins in exchange for Joseph Blandisi and Jake Lucchini. He was immediately assigned to join their affiliate, the Wilkes-Barre/Scranton Penguins.

On October 9, 2020, Barber signed a two-year, two-way contract with the Detroit Red Wings. On January 12, 2021, the Red Wings assigned Barber to the Grand Rapids Griffins. 

On July 14, 2022, Barber signed as a free agent to a one-year, two-way contract with the Dallas Stars.

Career statistics

Regular season and playoffs

International

Awards and honors

References

External links
 

1994 births
Living people
American men's ice hockey right wingers
Detroit Red Wings players
Dubuque Fighting Saints players
Grand Rapids Griffins players
Hershey Bears players
Ice hockey people from Pittsburgh
Laval Rocket players
Miami RedHawks men's ice hockey players
Montreal Canadiens players
Texas Stars players
USA Hockey National Team Development Program players
Washington Capitals draft picks
Washington Capitals players
Wilkes-Barre/Scranton Penguins players